Jean Hurring (née Stewart, 23 December 1930 – 8 August 2020) was a swimmer from New Zealand. She won a bronze medal in the 100 m backstroke at the 1952 Summer Olympics.

Biography
Born in Dunedin in 1930, Stewart was educated at Otago Girls' High School. When she was active as a swimmer, New Zealand had no swimming coach, and Stewart was mentored by Bill Wallace, who she described as an "enthusiast". Wallace had an interest in horse racing and from that, Stewart adopted interval training as an innovation. She had also set up a pulley system in her bedroom for weight training that was specific to swimming. She represented her native country at two consecutive Summer Olympics, 1952 and 1956. In 1952 she won the bronze medal in the women's 100 metres backstroke at the Helsinki Games. She shared a room in Helsinki with the only other New Zealand female competitor, Yvette Williams, who was also from Dunedin.

Stewart also won medals in the 110 yards backstroke at the Empire Games; silver in 1950 and bronze in 1954. As of 2016, she remains the only New Zealand woman to have won an Olympic swimming medal.

Stewart won 12 New Zealand national swimming titles: the 100 yards backstroke every year from 1950 to 1956 except 1955; the 220 yards backstroke every year from 1950 to 1954; and the 100 yards butterfly in 1953.

Stewart married fellow Dunedin swimmer Lincoln Hurring after the Helsinki Games, and they settled in Auckland. Their son is world silver medalist swimmer Gary Hurring. As of 2016, Hurring lived in a retirement village in Takapuna on Auckland's North Shore. Her son keeps her Olympic medal.

Stewart is one of eight New Zealand pool swimmers who have been inducted into the New Zealand Sports Hall of Fame and the only one who did not win a gold medal at either the Olympics or at Commonwealth Games.

Stewart died in Auckland on 8 August 2020 at the age of 89.

See also 
 List of Olympic medalists in swimming (women)

References

External links

 
Photo of Jean Stewart and Lincoln Hurring before they left for the 1952 Olympics

1930 births
2020 deaths
Swimmers from Dunedin
People educated at Otago Girls' High School
New Zealand female swimmers
Female backstroke swimmers
Olympic swimmers of New Zealand
Swimmers at the 1952 Summer Olympics
Swimmers at the 1956 Summer Olympics
Olympic bronze medalists for New Zealand
Olympic bronze medalists in swimming
Swimmers at the 1950 British Empire Games
Swimmers at the 1954 British Empire and Commonwealth Games
Commonwealth Games silver medallists for New Zealand
Commonwealth Games bronze medallists for New Zealand
Medalists at the 1952 Summer Olympics
Commonwealth Games medallists in swimming
Medallists at the 1950 British Empire Games
Medallists at the 1954 British Empire and Commonwealth Games